Lai Chun Ho (born February 5, 1989, in Hong Kong) is a track and field sprint athlete who competes internationally for Hong Kong.

In July 2008, Lai Chun Ho snatched gold in the 2008 Asian Junior Athletics Championships in Jakarta with a time of 10.46 seconds. He then teamed up with Tsui Chi Ho, Tong Hang and Chan Kei Fung to take bronze in the 4 × 100 m relay for Hong Kong.

Lai represented Hong Kong at the 2008 Summer Olympics in Beijing. He competed at the 100 metres sprint and placed 7th in his heat without advancing to the second round. He ran the distance in a time of 10.63 seconds.

Lai Chun-ho is a member of the sprint team that also includes Yip Siu-keung, Leung Ki-ho and Lawrence Ho who won bronze in the men's 4 × 100 m relay at the 2011 Summer Universiade in Shenzhen.

At the 2012 Asian Indoor Athletics Championships held in Hangzhou in February, Lai Chun Ho took the silver medal in the men's 60 metres sprint event with 6.78 seconds.

Lai is also a member of the team that ran in the Men's 4 × 100 metres relay race in the 2012 Summer Olympics in London. The team recorded 38.61 seconds in heat 2 and failed to make it to the final.

References

External links 

Hong Kong Olympic Committee 2012 Olympics athletes profile

1989 births
Living people
Hong Kong male sprinters
Olympic athletes of Hong Kong
Athletes (track and field) at the 2008 Summer Olympics
Athletes (track and field) at the 2012 Summer Olympics
Athletes (track and field) at the 2010 Asian Games
Athletes (track and field) at the 2014 Asian Games
Athletes (track and field) at the 2018 Asian Games
World Athletics Championships athletes for Hong Kong
Asian Games bronze medalists for Hong Kong
Medalists at the 2014 Asian Games
Asian Games medalists in athletics (track and field)
Universiade medalists in athletics (track and field)
Universiade medalists for Hong Kong
Medalists at the 2011 Summer Universiade